Edward "Ed" Vaughn (born July 30, 1934) is an American politician, businessman, and activist who served as a member of the Michigan House of Representatives from 1979 to 1980 and again from 1995 to 2000.

Early life and education 
Vaughn was born in Abbeville, Alabama. He earned a Bachelor of Arts degree in history and government from Fisk University and attended the University of Illinois College of Law for one year.

Career 
Vaughn moved to Detroit in 1956. He served in the United States Army and worked for the United States Postal Service. Vaughn also worked at local restaurants and sold books out of his car. Vaughn later opened a Black Power bookstore, supported by minister and writer Albert Cleage. The store became a bastion of the Black Power movement, and was significantly damaged during the Long, hot summer of 1967. Vaugh has been called an "understated Black Power icon" by Literary Hub. On November 7, 1978, Vaughn was first elected to the Michigan House of Representatives, where he represented the 8th district from January 10, 1979 to December 31, 1980. On November 8, 1994, Vaughn was again elected to in the state house where he represented the 4th district from January 11, 1995 until he was term limited on December 31, 2000.

Vaughn unsuccessfully ran for mayor of Detroit in 1997. Vaughn was also an unsuccessful candidate for the Michigan Senate seat representing the 2nd district in 2001.

In 2000, Vaugh participated in a forum hosted by the Congressional Black Caucus, in which he advocated for slavery reparations.

In 2018, Vaughn's writings were collected and donated to the library of Wayne State University.

Personal life 
Vaughn has six children.

References 

Living people
1934 births
African-American state legislators in Michigan
People from Abbeville, Alabama
Politicians from Detroit
Democratic Party members of the Michigan House of Representatives
Fisk University alumni
American civil rights activists
20th-century American politicians
20th-century African-American politicians
21st-century African-American people